In anatomy, a crystallin is a water-soluble structural protein found in the lens and the cornea of the eye  accounting for the transparency of the structure. It has also been identified in other places such as the heart, and in aggressive breast cancer tumors. Since it has been shown that lens injury may promote nerve regeneration,
crystallin has been an area of neural research. So far,  it has been demonstrated that crystallin β b2 (crybb2) may be a neurite-promoting factor.

Function

The main function of crystallins at least in the lens of the eye is probably to increase the refractive index while not obstructing light. However, this is not their only function. It has become clear that crystallins may have several metabolic and regulatory functions, both within the lens and in other parts of the body. More proteins containing βγ-crystallin domains have now been characterized as calcium binding proteins with Greek key motif as a novel calcium-binding motif.

Enzyme activity 

Some crystallins are active enzymes, while others lack activity but show homology to other enzymes. The crystallins of different groups of organisms are related to a large number of different proteins, with those from birds and reptiles related to lactate dehydrogenase and argininosuccinate lyase, those of mammals to alcohol dehydrogenase and quinone reductase, and those of cephalopods to glutathione S-transferase and aldehyde dehydrogenase. Whether these crystallins are products of a fortuitous accident of evolution, in that these particular enzymes happened to be transparent and highly soluble, or whether these diverse enzymatic activities are part of the protective machinery of the lens, is an active research topic. The recruitment of protein that originally evolved with one function to serve a second, unrelated function is an example of an exaptation.

Classification
Crystallins from a vertebrate eye lens are classified into three main types: alpha, beta and gamma crystallins. These distinctions are based on the order in which they elute from a gel filtration chromatography column. These are also called ubiquitous crystallins. Beta- and gamma-crystallins (such as CRYGC)  are similar in sequence, structure and domains topology, and thus have been grouped together as a protein superfamily called βγ-Crystallins. The α-crystallin family and βγ-crystallins compose the major family of proteins present in the crystalline lens.  They occur in all vertebrate classes (though gamma-crystallins are low or absent in avian lenses); and delta-crystallin is found exclusively in reptiles and birds.

In addition to these crystallins there are other taxon-specific crystallins which are only found in the lens of some organisms; these include delta, epsilon, tau, and iota-crystallins. For example, alpha, beta, and delta crystallins are found in avian and reptilian lenses, and the alpha, beta, and gamma families are found in the lenses of all other vertebrates.

Alpha-crystallin
 
Alpha-crystallin occurs as large aggregates, comprising two types of related subunits (A and B) that are highly similar to the small (15-30kDa) heat shock proteins (sHsps), particularly in their C-terminal halves. The relationship between these families is one of classic gene duplication and divergence, from the small HSP family, allowing adaptation to novel functions. Divergence probably occurred prior to evolution of the eye lens, alpha-crystallin being found in small amounts in tissues outside the lens.

Alpha-crystallin has chaperone-like properties including the ability to prevent the precipitation of denatured proteins and to increase cellular tolerance to stress. It has been suggested that these functions are important for the maintenance of lens transparency and the prevention of cataracts. This is supported by the observation that alpha-crystallin mutations show an association with cataract formation.

The N-terminal domain of alpha-crystallin is not necessary for dimerisation or chaperone activity, but appears to be required for the formation of higher order aggregates.

Beta and gamma crystallin
 
Beta- and gamma- crystallin form a separate family. Structurally, beta and gamma crystallins are composed of two similar domains which, in turn, are each composed of two similar motifs with the two domains connected by a short connecting peptide. Each motif, which is about forty amino acid residues long, is folded in a distinctive Greek key pattern. However, beta crystallin is an oligomer, composed of a complex group of molecules, whereas gamma crystallin is a simpler monomer.

References

Further reading

External links
 
 
 Lens Crystallin Crystal Structures by Christine Slingsby, Birkbeck College
 Crystallins: Molecule of the Month , by David Goodsell, RCSB Protein Data Bank

Structural proteins
Moonlighting proteins
Human eye anatomy